Niki (before 1954: Βύτσιστα - Vytsista) is a village in Kastoria Regional Unit, Macedonia, Greece.

Vytsista was populated by Muslim Albanians of the Bektashi Order. The Greek census (1920) recorded 318 people in the village and in 1923 there were 250 inhabitants (or 35 families) who were Muslim. Following the Greek-Turkish population exchange, in 1926 within Vytsista there was 1 refugee family from Asia Minor and 39 refugee families from Pontus. The Greek census (1928) recorded 123 inhabitants. There were 38 refugee families (131 people) in 1928. After the population exchange, the Pontian refugees converted the small tekke in the village into a church.

References

Populated places in Kastoria (regional unit)